Three ships of the Royal Navy have borne the name HMS Manchester after the city of Manchester in the north-west of England.

 HMS Manchester was a hired store ship in 1814.
  was a  cruiser launched in 1937 and lost in action in 1942. 
  was a Type 42 (Batch 3) destroyer launched in 1980. She participated in the 1991 Gulf War and was decommissioned on 17 February 2011.

Battle honours
 Norway 1940
 Spartivento 1940
 Malta 1942
 Arctic 1942
 Kuwait 1991

References

Royal Navy ship names